Euterpe, minor planet designation 27 Euterpe, is a stony asteroid and parent body of the Euterpe family, located in the inner asteroid belt, approximately 100 kilometers in diameter. It was discovered by English astronomer John Russell Hind at George Bishop's Observatory in London on 8 November 1853. The asteroid was named after Euterpe, the Muse of music in Greek mythology.

Euterpe is one of the brightest asteroids in the night sky. It had an apparent magnitude of 8.5 during a perihelic opposition on 25 December 2015 when the asteroid was about 1 AU from Earth. At the end of November 2022 it passed about 1.5 degrees from Uranus while in the constellation of Aries. Based on the S-type spectra the composition appears stony. It has a cross-section size of around 100–120 km. 27 Euterpe is orbiting the Sun with a period of 3.59 years and is spinning on its axis once every 10.4 hours.

It is the parent body of the Euterpe family, a stony inner-belt asteroid family of nearly 400 known members. Euterpe has been studied by radar.

Notes

References

External links 
 Asteroid Lightcurve Database (LCDB), query form (info )
 Dictionary of Minor Planet Names, Google books
 Asteroids and comets rotation curves, CdR – Observatoire de Genève, Raoul Behrend
 Discovery Circumstances: Numbered Minor Planets (1)-(5000) – Minor Planet Center
 
 

000027
Discoveries by John Russell Hind
Named minor planets
000027
000027
18531108